The Durg-class corvettes of the Indian Navy were customized variants of the Soviet Navy s. Three vessels of this class served in the Indian Navy, where they formed the 21st Missile Vessel Squadron (K21).

Durg-class vessels take their names from famous historical forts in India. The Durg class was primarily intended for coastal patrol and defence. They were the first class of vessels in the Indian Navy to primarily rely on surface-to-air missiles and anti-ship missiles for defence.

Design
The Durg class is also known as the Nanuchka II class. Some design improvements made for the Durg class were incorporated into the Nanuchka III class, commissioned into the Soviet Navy in the 1980s.

Ships of the class

References

 
Corvette classes
India–Soviet Union relations